Bonita Lynne Cullison (born March 24, 1954) is an American teacher, labor official and politician from Montgomery County, Maryland. A Democrat, she was elected to the Maryland House of Delegates in 2010, representing the state's 19th district. She took office on January 12, 2011.

Early life and career
Raised in a military family, Cullison lived in four states and two European countries until she was 18. Her parents had maintained residency in Maryland, and she returned to the state to attend college. Cullison earned both bachelor's and master's degrees from the University of Maryland, College Park and began working for the St. Mary's County school district in 1978.

Cullison moved from St. Mary's County to Montgomery County in 1981, where she worked as a special education teacher in the public schools. She worked as a special education teacher for 19 years. Twelve years of those years were spent teaching students with language disabilities at Kensington Parkwood Elementary.

Cullison was elected to office in the Montgomery County Education Association, an 11,000-member teachers' union. In 2003, she was elected the union's president, a post she held for six years. While serving as president, Cullison advocated for affordable housing for teachers and advocated against laying off teachers to save money,

In 2007, Cullison served as the chair of the Committee for Montgomery, a coalition of business and community leaders in Montgomery County, advocating for Montgomery County's interests in the Maryland General Assembly.

Cullison retired from the Montgomery County Education Association in 2009 and now works for the National Education Association.

In 2009, Cullison was the chief of the Montgomery County teachers' union. While seeking to be elected to the policy-setting executive committee of the National Education Association, Cullison raised money to pay for her campaign's travel, mailings, and other costs. She asked for contributions from Maryland state legislators, many of whom had previously been endorsed by the teachers' union. The Maryland State Attorney General's Office determined that political campaigns cannot fund a national union's internal election. The Maryland State Board of Elections ordered Cullison to refund the several thousand dollars she'd raised from state legislators, and she did so. Cullison was not elected to the position at the National Education Association.

Political career

2010 election
Cullison mounted a bid for the Maryland House of Delegates in 2010, running in the three-member 19th district. The district includes the Montgomery County communities of Silver Spring, Wheaton, Leisure World, Northwood, Four Corners, Aspen Hill, Kemp Mill, Olney, Derwood, Laytonsville and unincorporated areas of Rockville and Gaithersburg. Incumbents Roger Manno and Henry B. Heller had decided against seeking reelection, creating two open seats in the 19th.

Six Democrats filed to run in the primary election for delegate. The editorial board of The Washington Post endorsed her candidacy. In the Democratic primary election, Cullison placed second, winning one of the three Democratic nominations.

The editorial board of The Washington Post endorsed her in the general election. She won the general election.

First term
During Cullison's first term in office, she advocated in favor of establishing same-sex marriage in Maryland.

2014 election
Cullison ran for reelection in 2014. She won the Democratic primary election as well as the general election.

Second term
Cullison supports public school buses providing transportation for students attending private schools, saying doing so  helps parents and reduces traffic.

Personal
Cullison is openly gay; on June 23, 2013 she married her domestic partner of 30 years, Marcia Massey. She is one of eight openly LGBT members of the Maryland General Assembly, alongside Sen. Rich Madaleno (D–Kensington) and Dels. Anne Kaiser (D–Burtonsville), Heather Mizeur (D–Takoma Park), Peter Murphy (D–Bryans Road), Maggie McIntosh (D–Baltimore), Mary L. Washington (D–Baltimore) and Luke Clippinger (D–Baltimore).

Electoral results

2010 primary election

2010 general election

2014 primary election

2014 general election

References

External links
Biography courtesy of the Maryland State Archives
Campaign website

1954 births
American trade union leaders
Lesbian politicians
LGBT state legislators in Maryland
Living people
Democratic Party members of the Maryland House of Delegates
People from Silver Spring, Maryland
University of Maryland, College Park alumni
Women state legislators in Maryland
21st-century American politicians
21st-century American women politicians
21st-century LGBT people